Santiago Torti "Santi" Kolk (born 2 October 1981) is a Dutch former professional footballer. He currently works as a football agent. He mostly played as a forward during his career.

Kolk emerged as a talent from the ADO Den Haag academy in 1999, scoring in his senior debut. He signed with Heerenveen the following year, where he made his European debut, but soon saw himself loaned out to second-tier clubs. After a stint with Feyenoord, where he made no appearances, he returned to ADO where he experienced a breakout season, scoring 12 goals in 30 games which facilitated a move to Vitesse. Three successful seasons prompted him to join German 2. Bundesliga club Union Berlin. Injuries hindered him during his time there, and he retired as part of ADO in November 2013.

After his retirement, Kolk has worked as an agent for Juzzt Football, representing Denzel Dumfries among others.

Club career

ADO Den Haag
Born in The Hague, Kolk played youth football for Dynamo '67 in Rijswijk and HVV Laakkwartier, before joining the ADO Den Haag youth academy as a 15-year-old. He made his professional debut on 29 August 1999 as part of the ADO Den Haag first team in a home match against NAC Breda. Coming on as a second-half substitute for Dennis Iliohan, he scored his first goal after only being on the pitch for one minute as ADO won 3–0.

Heerenveen
In 2000, Kolk signed a five-year contract with SC Heerenveen at age 18 as an emerging talent. He made his debut for the club on 26 August 2000 in a 2–0 away win over Fortuna Sittard. On 25 October, Kolk made his European debut in the UEFA Champions League group stage match against Lyon, coming on as a 68th-minute substitute for Jeffrey Talan in a 2–0 home loss. He scored his first goal for Heerenveen on 17 December in a 3–0 away win over RBC Roosendaal. During his first season at the club, he would mostly appear as a substitute, as the club finished in a disappointing 10th place.

After returning from a loan at ADO, Kolk's chances of playing time improved after fellow forward Romano Denneboom was told to leave. This meant that Kolk was in the starting lineup against Spanish club Villarreal in the play-off round of the UEFA Cup on 26 August 2003. At Heerenveen, however, he clashed with head coach Foppe de Haan, which Kolk later admitted was due to his own "selfishness".

Loans
On 15 October 2001, RKC Waalwijk agreed to loan Kolk for the remainder of the season in order for him to gain more playing time. He made his first appearance for the club on 20 October in a 3–1 away loss to Willem II.

He spent the second half of the 2002–03 season on loan with his former club ADO Den Haag and the entire 2003–04 season Den Bosch, winning the second-tier Eerste Divisie with both clubs.

Feyenoord
On 14 August 2004, it was announced that Feyenoord had signed Kolk on a two-year contract with an option for two additional years. As part of the deal, Kolk was sent on loan to satellite club Excelsior. He scored 10 goals in 34 league appearances for the club during the 2004–05 season in which Excelsior finished 12th in the Eerste Divisie. Kolk later recalled his season with the club: "it was a team where fun was key. We laughed so much."

On 31 August 2005, Kolk was sent on a one-season loan to Zwolle, with Dominggus Lim-Duan making a move in the opposite direction to Excelsior. He had a highly successful season at the club, and finished as shared top scorer of the Eerste Divisie with 19 goals, alongside Berry Powel.

Return to ADO
On 11 May 2006, Kolk returned to his first senior club ADO on a two-year contract. He made 30 appearances during the 2006–07 season, in which he scored 12 goals as he could not heed the club from relegation, with ADO finishing bottom of the league.

In 2007, after having played for seven clubs in eight years, Kolk commented on the fact that he had played for a relatively large number of different clubs, by stating: "I am sort of the Dutch Christian Vieri."

Vitesse
Kolk signed a four-year contract with Vitesse on 31 May 2007, after turning down an offer from Twente. Signing with Vitesse, he was united with fellow Hagenees, head coach Aad de Mos who played a substantial role in signing Kolk. He would grow into a key player for the club, scoring 12 goals in 2008.

In October 2009, Kolk lost his place in the starting lineup after suffering an achilles tendon injury. While he recuperated from the injury, Nicky Hofs and Lasse Nilsson formed a duo in attack, with Kolk only returning as a starter on 22 January 2010 after a suspension for Hofs. His contract was not renewed after the 2009–10 season. He made 87 appearances during his time at Vitesse, in which he scored 23 goals.

Union Berlin
In July 2010, Kolk agreed to a three-year contract with 1. FC Union Berlin, who at that point were playing in the 2. Bundesliga. He made his debut for the club on 15 August against Hallescher FC. In his second game on 28 August, he scored a goal against SpVgg Greuther Fürth. He scored three goals in his first six games, after which his season was repeatedly interrupted by injuries and ended prematurely in March 2011 with a foot injury. In total, he made 17 appearances and scored four goals in the 2010–11 season. In the 2011–12 season Kolk would go on to play for NAC Breda on loan. In June 2012, Union and Kolk decided to terminate his contract by mutual consent, making him a free agent.

In January 2013, Kolk returned to ADO Den Haag for the fourth time in his career. He had secured a contract after a successful trial where he, among others, impressed at the team's training camp in Estepona.

Kolk announced his retirement from football on 27 November 2013, after a move to the Indian Super League fell through. He would instead focus on obtaining his coaching diploma.

International career
Kolk also played in several Dutch national youth teams. He was part of Louis van Gaal's squad for the 2001 FIFA World Youth Championship in Argentina.

Post-playing career
In 2014, a year after retiring from football, Kolk started as an agent and was hired by Juzzt Football, a Dutch football agency. He represented Denzel Dumfries until 2019.

Honours
ADO Den Haag
 Eerste Divisie: 2002–03

Den Bosch
 Eerste Divisie: 2003–04

Individual
 Eerste Divisie Golden Boot: 2005–06

References

1981 births
Living people
Dutch footballers
Netherlands youth international footballers
Netherlands under-21 international footballers
Footballers from The Hague
ADO Den Haag players
FC Den Bosch players
SC Heerenveen players
RKC Waalwijk players
Excelsior Rotterdam players
PEC Zwolle players
SBV Vitesse players
1. FC Union Berlin players
NAC Breda players
Eredivisie players
Eerste Divisie players
2. Bundesliga players
Dutch expatriate footballers
Expatriate footballers in Germany
Association football wingers
Association football forwards
Association football agents
Dutch expatriate sportspeople in Germany